Realized Fantasies is the fifth studio album by the Norwegian hard rock band TNT.

Track listing

Personnel

Band 
Tony Harnell – vocals
Ronni Le Tekrø – guitars, keyboards, 1/4 stepper guitar
Morty Black – bass guitar
John Macaluso – drums, percussion

Additional personnel
Joe Lynn Turner – background vocals
Dag Stokke – keyboards on track 6
Rich Tancredi – keyboards
T.J. Kopetic – keyboards
Peter Wood – piano on "Easy Street"
Kyf Brewer – harp on "All You Need"

Chart

Album

Singles

Album credits 
Ric Wake – producer
Gary Lyons – mixing

Sources
http://www.ronniletekro.com/discography-album-12.html

1992 albums
TNT (Norwegian band) albums
Albums produced by Ric Wake
Atlantic Records albums